Hill College may refer to:
 One of a number of colleges of Durham University on Elvet Hill
 One of a number of colleges of the University of Cambridge on Castle Hill
 Hill College, Hillsboro, Texas, USA

See also
 College Hill (disambiguation)